Iodamide (trade name Renovue) is a pharmaceutical drug used as an iodinated contrast medium for X-ray imaging. Its uses include imaging of the uterus and Fallopian tubes.

References 

Radiocontrast agents
Iodoarenes
Acetanilides
Acetamides